Parti Marhaen Malaysia (PMM) was a former left-wing party formed by Ahmad Boestamam.

History
The party were formed by Ahmad Boestamam on 20 July 1968, 8 hours before he left Malaysia for London to pursue legal studies for two and a half years.

They were formed due to disputes between Ahmad Boestamam, the first president of Partai Rakyat, and his successor, Kassim Ahmad, regarding the Marhaenism ideology that was left by the party leadership.

They were led by the triumvirate of Ishak Surin, Shariff Babol (former founder of Partai Rakyat) and Sheikh Hassan Jaafar.

The party merged with Parti Keadilan Masyarakat Malaysia (PEKEMAS) on 19 July 1974.

List of party leaders

Aftermath
The party tried to reinvigorate the Socialist Front coalition before the 1974 elections, but failed.

See also
Politics of Malaysia
List of political parties in Malaysia
Parti Negara

References

Socialist parties in Malaysia
Political parties established in 1968
1968 establishments in Malaysia
Defunct political parties in Malaysia